is an indoor sporting arena located in Komatsu, Ishikawa, Japan. The capacity of the arena is 1,500 people and was opened in 1997.

Komatsu, Ishikawa
Indoor arenas in Japan
Sports venues in Ishikawa Prefecture
1997 establishments in Japan
Sports venues completed in 1997
Covered stadiums in Japan